Mount Olive is an unincorporated community in Richland Township in eastern Washington County, Arkansas, United States. It is located on Mount Olive Road, east of Elkins and the Mount Olive Cemetery is about one quarter mile west of the Washington-Madison county line.

References

Unincorporated communities in Washington County, Arkansas
Unincorporated communities in Arkansas